Blændværk is a 1955 Danish crime film drama directed by Johan Jacobsen. The film stars Mimi Heinrich.

Plot
Børge Rasmussen is in love with Elvie Hansen. During a visit at doctor Kermer's, Børge steals a small fortune in cash. Together with Elvie, he runs off to Copenhagen. On their way there, Elvie breaks up. In Copenhagen, the saboteur Verner seeks out Børge, convincing him to go to Canada, bringing a briefcase for a friend of Verner's. Børges friend, Marinus, finds out that there is a bomb in the briefcase, but on his way to warn Børge, Marinus is murdered. Before dying, though, he manages to tell doctor Kermer about the bomb. Together with Elvie, Kermer now leaves for Copenhagen to save Børge.

Cast
Mimi Heinrich as Elvi Hansen
Henrik Wiehe as Børge Rasmussen
Poul Reichhardt as Labour union chairman Marinus
Kjeld Petersen as President of the party Werner Schultz
Poul Müller as Seaman Otto
Asbjørn Andersen as Dr. med. Hans Kerner
Vera Gebuhr as Charlotte Kerner
Johannes Meyer as Editor at Sallinghavn county paper
Karen Lykkehus as Elvis' mother, Dagny
Jakob Nielsen as Pilot Anthon Olsen
Jørn Jeppesen as Børges master, Auto-Søren
Lauritz Olsen as Waiter Frandsen
Bodil Udsen as Lady from child welfare services

External links
 
Danish Film Institute

Danish crime drama films
1950s Danish-language films
1955 films
1955 crime drama films
Films directed by Johan Jacobsen
Danish black-and-white films